Walter R. Cooney Jr. is an American chemical engineer, amateur astronomer and discoverer of minor planets and variable stars.

Cooney, who is affiliated with the Highland Road Park Observatory, is credited by the Minor Planet Center with the discovered of 47 numbered minor planets during 1998–2005, such as his lowest numbered identification 11739 Baton Rouge, a Hildian asteroid named after the city of Baton Rouge where the discovering observatory is located.

Many of his minor planet discoveries he made in collaboration with astronomers Matthew Collier, Patrick M. Motl, Susannah Lazar, Katrina Wefel, Terry Martin, Merrill Hess, Ethan Kandler, Meredith Howard, and most recently with John Gross.

Cooney is also credited with discovering more than 50 variable stars.

List of discovered minor planets

References 
 

20th-century  American astronomers
21st-century  American astronomers
Discoverers of asteroids

Living people
Year of birth missing (living people)